Rieke Dieckmann (born 16 August 1996) is a German footballer who plays as a midfielder for Frauen-Bundesliga club Werder Bremen.

In May 2018 it was announced that she will play for Turbine Potsdam in the 2018–19 season.

References

External links

 

1996 births
Living people
German women's footballers
Women's association football midfielders
Germany women's youth international footballers
Frauen-Bundesliga players
Bayer 04 Leverkusen (women) players
MSV Duisburg (women) players
1. FFC Turbine Potsdam players
SV Werder Bremen (women) players
Expatriate sportspeople in the Netherlands
Expatriate women's footballers in the Netherlands